Kota Setar was a federal constituency in Kedah, Malaysia, represented in the Dewan Rakyat since 1955 to 1959 and 1974 to 1995. It was created in the 1959 redistribution and was mandated to return a single member to the Dewan Rakyat under the first past the post voting system.

History
It was abolished in 1995 when it was redistributed.

Representation history

State constituency

Election results

References

Defunct Kedah federal constituencies
Constituencies established in 1974
Constituencies disestablished in 1995